Batorz  is a village in Janów Lubelski County, Lublin Voivodeship, in eastern Poland. It is the seat of the gmina (administrative district) called Gmina Batorz.

The village has a population of 982.

During the January Uprising, on September 6, 1863, the Battle of Sowia Góra was fought nearby, in which Polish insurgents and Hungarian volunteers were defeated by Russian troops.

References

Villages in Janów Lubelski County
Lublin Governorate
Lublin Voivodeship (1919–1939)